William Frederick Hoppe (October 11, 1887 – February 1, 1959) (surname rhymes with "poppy"), was an internationally renowned American professional carom billiards champion. Hoppe is widely considered one of the greatest billiards players of all time and was posthumously inducted into the Billiard Congress of America Hall of Fame in 1966.

Biography
Hoppe was born in Cornwall on Hudson, New York, on October 11, 1887. He won 51 world titles between 1906 and 1952, in three forms of carom billiards: three-cushion, (four sub-disciplines of) balkline and one-cushion caroms. He died on February 1, 1959, in Miami, Florida.
He is buried in Whitemarsh Cemetery in Ambler, Pa.

Professional career

Hoppe won 51 world titles between 1906 and 1952. He was also known for various long-standing high , including scoring 2,000 contiguous points in straight rail, 622 points in 18.2 balkline, and a run of 25 points in three-cushion. He once made a tournament average of 1.333, a world record at that time.

Hoppe published his first book, Thirty Years of Billiards, in 1925, and followed this up many years later with the introductory work, Billiards As It Should Be Played, in 1941. Hoppe's peculiar style of stroke was a result of his career as a child prodigy. He barely reached the table and had to stand on a box. In Billiards As It Should Be Played Hoppe emphatically advised players not to use his way of directing the cue.

After winning the world title in 1952, Hoppe retired from title play and became a goodwill ambassador for the sport by conducting a series of exhibition matches.  Hoppe may have been the only  billiards player to ever put on an exhibition in the White House.  He performed before President William Taft in 1911.

He was ranked number 1 on the Billiards Digest 50 Greatest Players of the Century.

Titles and tournament wins
 World 18.1 Balkline Championship (1906, 1908-1911, 1914-1927)  
 World 18.2 Balkline Championship (1907, 1910-1920, 1923, 1924, 1927)
 World Three-Cushion Championship (1936, 1940-1944, 1946-1952)

References

External links

Willie Hoppe bio at BilliardsForum
Willie Hoppe bio at BC De Deken

American carom billiards players
1887 births
1959 deaths
Three-cushion billiards players
World champions in carom billiards
People from Cornwall-on-Hudson, New York